MV Naomh Éanna is a decommissioned ferry which historically operated as the primary connection on the Galway to Aran Islands route for Córas Iompair Éireann (CIÉ) replacing the SS Dun Aengus.

In August 1958, three months after entering service, she was among the ships to respond to the loss of KLM Flight 607-E.

Construction

Along with similar vessels the MV Cill Airne and its exact replica, the MV Blarna (both commissioned 1961), she was one of the last riveted-hull ships built in Europe and one of the last ships to be built in the Liffey Dockyards.

Decommissioning

Naomh Éanna was taken out of service in 1986 or 1988.

In 1989, she was acquired by the Irish Nautical Trust and moved to Dublin's Grand Canal Dock. In this location she housed a surf shop and sailmakers, and until 2014 was proposed to become the centrepiece of a "maritime quarter" in the Grand Canal Docks.

Later use
In February 2014 she was moved by Waterways Ireland to the Grand Canal Docks' graving dock for deconstruction, but the break-up was postponed due to public opposition and eventually dropped as a plan materialized to convert her to a tourist attraction in her original home port of Galway. In 2014, she was the subject of a TV documentary directed by Donncha Mac Con Iomaire on TG4.

, she has been proposed to be converted into a five-star hotel on the River Liffey. The conversion plan never came to fruition and as of summer 2021 the ship remained in a deteriorated state. On January 18, 2023, whilst at Dublin Docks, she capsized.

References

External links

1957 ships
Ferries of the Republic of Ireland
Dublin Docklands